The 2001 European Junior Swimming Championships were held in Valletta, Malta 5–8 July.

Medal table

Results

Boy's events

|-
| 50 m freestyle

|-
| 100 m freestyle

|-
| 200 m freestyle

|-
| 400 m freestyle

|-
| 1500 m freestyle

|-
| 50 m backstroke

|-
| 100 m backstroke

|-
| 200 m backstroke

|-
| 50 m breaststroke

|-
| 100 m breaststroke

|-
| 200 m breaststroke

|-
| 50 m butterfly

|-
| 100 m butterfly

|-
| 200 m butterfly

|-
| 200 m individual medley

|-
| 400 m individual medley

|-
| 4×100 m freestyle relay

|-
| 4×200 m freestyle relay

|-
| 4×100 m medley relay

|}

Girl's events

|-
| 50 m freestyle

|-
| 100 m freestyle

|-
| 200 m freestyle

|-
| 400 m freestyle

|-
| 800 m freestyle

|-
| 50 m backstroke

|-
| 100 m backstroke

|-
| 200 m backstroke

|-
| 50 m breaststroke

|-
| 100 m breaststroke

|-
| 200 m breaststroke

|-
| 50 m butterfly

|-
| 100 m butterfly

|-
| 200 m butterfly

|-
| 200 m individual medley

|-
| 400 m individual medley

|-
| 4×100 m freestyle relay

|-
| 4×200 m freestyle relay

|-
| 4×100 m medley relay

|}

J
S
European Junior Swimming Championships
July 2001 sports events in Europe
Swimming
Sport in Valletta
International sports competitions hosted by Malta